evolution@home was a volunteer computing project for evolutionary biology, launched in 2001. The aim of evolution@home is to improve understanding of evolutionary processes. This is achieved by simulating individual-based models. The Simulator005 module of evolution@home was designed to better predict the behaviour of Muller's ratchet.

The project was operated semi-automatically; participants had to manually download tasks from the webpage and submit results by email using this method of operation. yoyo@home used a BOINC wrapper to completely automate this project by automatically distributing tasks and collecting their results. Therefore, the BOINC version was a complete volunteer computing project. yoyo@home has declared its involvement in this project finished.

See also
Artificial life
Digital organism
Evolutionary computation
Folding@home
List of volunteer computing projects

References

 Science in society
Free science software
Volunteer computing projects
Digital organisms
Bioinformatics